Space Launch Complex 2 (SLC-2) is an active rocket launch site at Vandenberg Space Force Base, in California, USA. It consists of two launch pads. The East pad (SLC-2E, originally LC 75-1-1) was used for Delta, Thor-Agena and Thorad launches between 1966 and 1972 and has been demolished. The West pad (SLC-2W, originally LC 75-1-2) was used for Delta, Thor-Agena and Delta II launches from 1966 until 2018, when the Delta II performed its last flight.

SLC-2W has been repurposed to launch Firefly Alpha for Firefly Aerospace. During the demolition process, a fire broke out on October 15, 2020, inside the Delta II mobile service tower. The maiden flight of Firefly Alpha took place on September 3, 2021 and resulted in a flight failure. The second flight on 1 October 2022 was successful in reaching orbit.

Space Launch Complex 2 was originally part of Launch Complex 75 (LC 75) and was known by designation LC 75-1 or just 75-1 (and the launch pads were designated LC 75-1-1 and LC 75-1-2). The first launch out of the newly designated Space Launch Complex 2 was that of a Delta E with ESSA-3 on 2 October 1966 from SLC-2E.

References

External links 
Encyclopedia Astronautica - Vandenberg SLC-2

Vandenberg Space Force Base